The adjective ferruginous may mean:
 Containing iron, applied to water, oil, and other non-metals
 Having rust on the surface
 With the rust (color)

See also
 Ferrous, containing iron (for metals and alloys) or iron(II) cations
 Ferric, containing iron(III) cations
 Ferrate, anions containing iron
 Ferruginous body, a nodule indicative of asbestos inhalation
 Ferruginea (disambiguation)
 List of birds described as ferruginous